John Leslie Gwyn Thomas (14 March 1891 – ) was a Welsh sportsman who played both rugby and cricket at domestic level. Thomas was born and died in Neath.

Thomas played both sports for Neath while attending grammar school, his cricket skill commended on account of his bold striking of the ball and free scoring, possessing enough power to lift the ball out of the cricket ground. He became a regular team member in Glamorgan's Minor Counties fixtures between 1910 and 1920, before finally getting his chance at first-class cricket in 1922, when other batsmen became unavailable, before being interrupted in his quest for further possible play by his business commitments.

Thomas played rugby union for Neath RFC, captaining the team during the 1920–21 season. He also played for Barbarian F.C. between 1912 and 1920.

Thomas died in 1932 at the age of 41.

External links 
 Gwyn Thomas at Cricket Archive 

1891 births
1932 deaths
Barbarian F.C. players
Cricketers from Neath
Glamorgan cricketers
Neath RFC players
People educated at Neath Grammar School for Boys
Rugby union players from Neath
Welsh cricketers
Welsh rugby union players